The Pramuka Movement of Indonesia, officially the Praja Muda Karana Scouting Movement, is the national scouting organization of Indonesia. 
Scouting was founded in the Dutch East Indies in 1912, and Indonesia became a member of the World Organization of the Scout Movement (WOSM) in 1953. Its membership is compulsory for students. It has 21,599,748 members (as of 2011), making it the world's largest Scout association.

The organization was established in 1961 as a part of the late Sukarno government's attempt to create a Scouting-like movement "freed from (the influences of) Baden-Powell", a goal largely reversed under the succeeding Suharto government. August 14 is celebrated as Pramuka Day to honour the organisation's first public parade in 1961, wherein independence hero Sultan Hamengkubuwono IX of Yogyakarta was appointed as the first Chief Scout of the GPI.

With the 2013 education curriculum in effect, it is compulsory for all Indonesian students to join the scout movement as scouting is officially one of the study units in the curriculum. This contributes to the movement's recognition as the world's largest.

The name Pramuka was derived from the acronym of "Praja muda karana", (Sanskrit: young people willing to work), but was originally proposed by Hamengkubuwono IX from the Javanese term  (lit. "front line soldier"). The Pramuka word in Indonesia is currently often used as a term for scouting.

Unlike other Scouting organizations the GPI uses a full military salute instead of the usual Scout sign and salute, honoring the fighting youth of the foundational organizations that formed the GPI for their service during the long Indonesian National Revolution (1945-49).

History

Colonial Period

Scouting came to Dutch East Indies in 1912, as a branch of the Nederlandse Padvinders Organisatie (NPO, Netherlands Pathfinder Organisation). After 1916 it was called the Vereeniging Nederlandsch Indische Padvinders (Association of Dutch Indies Pathfinders). Other Scouting organizations were established by the Indonesia Scouts in 1916. As the Dutch East Indies, Indonesia had been a branch of the Netherlands Scout Association, yet Scouting was very popular, and had achieved great numbers and standards.

After Independence
When Indonesia became an independent country, there were more than 60 separate Boy Scout and Girl Guide organizations. Most were directly affiliated with some certain political parties or social groups. And there was one national organization - the People's Scouts (Pandu Rakyat Indonesia), founded on 27-29 December 1945, just almost half a year since independence, in its 1st Congress in Surakarta. Attempts were made to unify all Scout organizations into one. The fact that Indonesia is made up of many islands made administration and supervision difficult, and the Japanese occupation caused some twenty separate Scout organizations to spring up, and it took time for them to coalesce.  In September 1951, in a Jakarta conference, the People's Scouts, recognized by the Ministry of Education twice in 1947 and 1950 as the official Scout organization of the young nation, and the other 12 of the stronger Scout and Guide organizations nationwide met and decided to found a federating body to satisfy national and international needs. Representatives of these organizations decided that the time had come to merge into one national organization for Indonesian Scouting and Guiding.

With their cooperation, the Ikatan Pandu Indonesia (Ipindo, Indonesian Scouting Union) came into being. Government approval of Ipindo was granted on 22 February 1952, and President Sukarno consented to become patron of the unifying and correlating National Scout Council. With the formation of Ipindo, Indonesia became a full member of the World Organization of the Scout Movement in 1953 as an organization of its Asia-Pacific Region. In 1955 the Ipindo hosted the country's first Scout Jamboree in Pasar Minggu, South Jakarta.

With the beginning of the Guided Democracy period came a period of unification of all Scout and Guide organizations into one.  On 9 March 1961, in the State Palace of Jakarta, in the presence of Ipinido representatives and those of other organizations, President Sukarno gave his blessing for the unification of Indonesian Scouting and Guiding into one national organization. With the April 1961 decision to merge the Fadjar Harapan Pioneer movement organization (founded in 1959) into Ipindo and other organizations, the establishment of a single Scout Movement organization in Indonesia called "Gerakan Pramuka" was officially completed.

On 20 May 1961, President Sukarno signed a presidential regulation formally declaring Gerakan Pramuka as the official Scout and Guide organization in Indonesia and official heir and successor to the legacies of the former Scout and Guide organizations of the republic, inheriting thus Indonesia's membership in WOSM from Ipindo. On 30 July, at the Istora Gelora Bung Karno in Jakarta, the GPI was officially launched as the country's national co-ed Scouting and Guiding organization on the basis of the existing organizations in the republic.

Gerakan Pramuka is a former member of the World Association of Girl Guides and Girl Scouts, having left WAGGGS and added the girls' program to WOSM also in 2002.

After Sri Sultan Hamengkubuwono IX, other Indonesian recipients of the Bronze Wolf, the only distinction of the World Organization of the Scout Movement, awarded by the World Scout Committee for exceptional services to world Scouting, include Abdul Azis Saleh in 1978, John Beng Kiat Liem in 1982 and retired Lieutenant General Mashudi in 1985.

Gerakan Pramuka was made into a compulsory extracurricular activity in 2013 with the adoption of Kurikulum 2013, the Indonesian school curriculum of 2013. Despite that, schools, especially elementary schools, have made Pramuka into a compulsory extracurricular activity long before this policy.

Founding Organizations 
By the time the GPI was founded in 1961, the following organizations helped in its formation:

 Ikatan Pandu Indonesia (Ipindo)
 Fadjar Harapan
 Persatuan Kepanduan Puteri Indonesia (PKPI) 
 Persatuan Organisasi Pandu Puteri Indonesia (POPPINDO)

Programme

The Pramuka Movement incorporates both boys and girls. It is an educational movement through Scouting activities, the education being directed toward a new, just, peaceful and prosperous Indonesian community based on the national ideology. Activities of the boys and girls are conducted separately from one another. They have joint activities whenever possible and necessary. Management of the Scout Movement is carried out by the National Quarter (Kwartir Nasional or Kwarnas).

Education for young members is carried out through activities to achieve General Skill Requirements (Syarat Kecakapan Umum/SKU) and Special Skill Requirements (Syarat Kecakapan Khusus/SKK) (merit badge system) towards achieving Garuda Scout.

To achieve the goals of Scouting, activities are carried out on the group and national level. Routine activities are focused on the development of character, patriotism, physical fitness, skill and intelligence of the Scouts themselves which are very important for their future life. Activities of the special troops are organized in order to develop specific personal interest and talent and enable them to serve the community with the knowledge, ability and skill he/she have learned.

The Scouts take an active part in community development service projects. They take an active part in combating illiteracy. The success of the campaign against illiteracy in one province, gained the Scouts worldwide recognition and won them a UNESCO award.

The Scouts also participate in the drive to improve health and nutrition in the community, especially children under five years of age. Acting as extension workers, they practice how to raise cattle, fish, breed hens and grow vegetables.

Membership badge 
The Scout emblem incorporates the seed of the coconut palm, a common native Indonesian plant and all parts of which are used in Indonesian everyday life, symbolizing the philosophy of a true Scout, who must make him or herself useful in all aspects of life. The seed form represents the growing spirit, physical toughness, adaptability, and high aspiration of the Scout. The logo is in maroon. The logo is the basis of the wider membership badge, which also incorporates the star, rice paddy and cotton from the national coat of arms Garuda Pancasila.

Age groups

Gerakan Pramuka is divided in two major educational groups: the member section and the adult section. The first is divided in further age-groups with different educational systems, the second provides the leaders and supports the younger members.

The age-groups are:
 Cub Scouts ("Pramuka Siaga")  ages 7 to 10, or equal to elementary school's 1st-3rd grade, consists of:
 Siaga Mula
 Siaga Bantu
 Siaga Tata
 Scouts ("Pramuka Penggalang") – ages  11 to 15, or equal to elementary school's 4th-6th grade and junior high school's 7th-9th grade, consists of:
 Penggalang Ramu
 Penggalang Rakit
 Penggalang Terap
 Rover Scouts ("Pramuka Penegak") – ages 16 to 20, or equal to senior high school's 10th-12th grade, consists of:
 Penegak Bantara
 Penegak Laksana
 Venturer Scouts ("Pramuka Pandega") – ages 21 to 25, or equal to academy/university students.
 Adult members – ages 26 and older

Awards
Activities are mainly carried out to achieve advancement through the Syarat kecakapan Umum (SKU) or Advancement Badge and Syarat Kecakapan Khusus (TKK) or Merit Badge system. The highest rank in each age group is Pramuka Garuda (Eagle Scout).

Rover and Venture Scout Special Unit 
In Pramuka, there are Rover and Venturer Scouts Special Units called Satuan Karya (SAKA). In those units, the Rovers and Venturers are able to learn various skills to be specialist that are useful for their future careers as well as to provide services to the community. There are ten different units:
 Law Enforcement Special Unit (Saka Bhayangkara) -  in coordination with the Indonesian National Police and the Civil Service Police Units
 Air Mindedness Special Unit (Saka Dirgantara) -  in coordination with the Indonesian National Armed Forces and the Ministry of Transportation 
 Sea and Maritime Special Unit (Saka Bahari)  - in coordination with the Indonesian National Armed Forces, the Ministry of Transportation and the Ministry of Maritime Affairs and Fisheries
 Health Care And Services Special Unit (Saka Bakti Husada) - in coordination with the Ministry of Health
 Population And Family Planning Special Unit (Saka Kencana/Saka Keluarga Berencana) - in coordination with the Ministry of Health
 Plantation And Agriculture Special Unit (Saka Taruna Bumi) - in coordination with the Ministry of Agriculture
 Forest Preserver Special Unit (Saka Wana Bakti) - in coordination with the Ministry of Environment and Forestry
 Homeland Defense Special Unit (Saka Wira Kartika) - in coordination with the Indonesian National Armed Forces
 Tourism Guides Special Unit (Saka Pariwisata) - in coordination with the National Police, Civil Service Police and the Ministry of Tourism
 Education and Culture Special Unit (Saka Widya Budaya Bakti) - in coordination with the Ministry of Education and Culture
 Environment Special Unit (Saka Kalpataru)  -  in coordination with the Ministry of Environment and Forestry
 Information and Communications Technology Special Unit (Saka Telematika) - in coordination with the Ministry of Communications and Information Technology

Scout Promise (Tri Satya)

On My Honour, I promise that I will do my best to:
 Fulfill my obligation to God and the Republic of Indonesia, and to obey Pancasila
 Help other people and get involved in community building
 Obey the Scout Law.

Scout Law (Dasa Darma)

 Believe in God the Almighty (Takwa Kepada Tuhan Yang Maha Esa)
 Preserve nature and love each other (Cinta Alam dan Kasih Sayang Sesama Manusia)
 Be an affable and knightly patriot (Patriot yang Sopan dan Kesatria)
 Be obedient and collegial (Patuh dan Suka Bermusyawarah)
 Help others with compliance and resilience (Rela Menolong dan Tabah)
 Be diligent, skilled and cheerful (Rajin, Terampil, dan Gembira)
 Be provident and simple (Hemat, Cermat, dan Bersahaja)
 Exercise discipline, be brave and faithful (Disiplin, Berani, dan Setia)
 Be accountable and trustworthy (Bertanggung Jawab dan Dapat Dipercaya)
 Have purity in thoughts, words and actions (Suci dalam Pikiran, Perkataan, dan Perbuatan)

Councils
Gerakan Pramuka operates and maintains 34 province-level territorial councils (kwartir daerah) each corresponding to provincial borders and a National Council or Headquarters (Kwartir Nasional) for top-level staff and employees.

National Special Scout Jamborees
A National Special Scout Jamboree is held every five years for disabled Scouts. The seventh National Special Scouts Jamboree was held in 2007, in East Jakarta. The first jamboree of this sort to be held in Indonesia was in 1972.

Controversies
In July 2017, the Indonesian government suspended support for Gerakan Pramuka Indonesia after Chairman of the Scout National Quarter (Kwarnas) Adhyaksa Dault expressed support for Hizb-ut Tahrir, as Hizb-ut Tahrir is against Indonesia's legislative foundation of Pancasila, an ideology based on a multi-faith democracy. Financial assistance was suspended pending clarification from Adhyaksa Dault over his presence at a Hizb-ut Tahrir rally in 2013 and interview to a Hizb-ut Tahrir videographer expressing "Caliphate is the teaching of the Prophet. If God is willing, with or without our help, the caliphate will rise. Our ways may be different but our goal is the same. That is why I'm here. We keep making small changes. We have to make big changes. World order must be changed. We must impose sharia."

International units in Indonesia
In addition, there are American Boy Scouts in Jakarta linked to the Direct Service branch of the Boy Scouts of America, which supports units around the world. There is also group from British Scouting Overseas which support scouting at British School Jakarta.

See also
Bung Tomo
Hamengkubuwono IX, former vice president and founder of the GPI
Paskibraka

References

Further reading
 Scouting 'Round the World, John S. Wilson, first edition, Blandford Press 1959

External links
  
 Pramuka.id, official news website of the Pramuka Movement

Scouting in Indonesia
World Organization of the Scout Movement member organizations
Youth organizations established in 1961
Articles containing video clips